Parameria (common name naranjo podrido) is a genus of flowering plants in the dogbane family, Apocynaceae, first described as a genus in 1876. It is native to southern China and Southeast Asia.

Species
 Parameria densiflora Oliv. - Penang in Malaysia, Sumatra
 Parameria laevigata (Juss.) Moldenke - Yunnan, Guangxi, Andaman & Nicobar Islands, Myanmar, Thailand, Laos, Vietnam, Cambodia, Malaysia, Borneo, Sumatra, Java, Lesser Sunda Islands, Sulawesi, Philippines - local name (Indonesia) - Kayu Rapet
 Parameria polyneura Hook.f. - Myanmar, Thailand, W Malaysia, Sumatra, Borneo local name (Malaysia) - Akar Serapat

formerly included
 Parameria esquirolii H.Lév. = Sindechites henryi Oliv.
 Parameria pedunculosa (Miq.) Benth. ex B.D.Jacks. = Urceola rosea (Hook. & Arn.) D.J.Middleton
 Parameria wariana Schltr. = Micrechites warianus (Schltr.) D.J.Middleton

References

Apocynaceae genera
Apocyneae